Pearic peoples (from ; also Por) refers to indigenous groups, including the Pear, Samre, Chong, Samray, and Sa'och, which speak one of the Pearic languages and live a sparse existence after years of conflict in Cambodia and Thailand. Pearic groups speak different, but closely related, languages and share many cultural traits that differ markedly from the dominant Khmer and Thai cultures.

Ethnography
Pearic peoples include: Samré in Pursat Province; Samray in Battambang; Chong and Chong-Samré in Trat Province of eastern Thailand; and Chong la and Chong heap, in Chanthaburi Province, Thailand.

In the Pear communities in Preah Vihear Province, the Pear population was estimated to be 299 households (1,674 persons) in 2002. 

According to the Pear Samray people of Kranhung, the Kulen hill region's Samray survived because of emigration in the days of the Angkor kingdom. After the 1967 revolt of Samlaut, Pear of the Stung Kranhung area moved to Ta Sanh.

While some Sa'och live in Cambodia's coastal area, many Sa'och from the Kampong Som area were taken captive by the Thais in the 1830s and resettled in Kanchanaburi Province, Thailand. Some Sa'och show physical characteristics similar to Negritos and in this respect are different from other Pearic peoples. Martin speculates the Sa'och inhabited the higher areas and the Samré the lower slopes and flatter areas before the arrival of Khmer from Champassak in about the 6th century. 

The Chong (or Chhong) are Pearic peoples who live in both Thailand and Cambodia, In Thailand, Chong inhabit Trat Province and Chanthaburi Province. , the Chong in Koh Kong Province, Cambodia are seeking to prevent construction of the Cheay Areng Dam, which would displace local residents.

Pearic peoples traditionally cultivate upland rice by the swidden method.  

They follow traditional religions.

Language

The people speak the endangered group of Pearic languages. Gérard Diffloth (1992) states that the language and customs of the Pear are radically different from other social groups in Cambodia.

References

Further reading
 Brunet, J. The Mouth Organ Among the Samre of the Cardamom Mountains. Kuala Lumpur: Malaysian Society for Asian Studies, 1969.
 Ironside, J., 2005.  Overview of the History and Distribution of Pear (Por) Groups in Cambodia. Ministry of Land Management/GTZ/FFI, Phnom Penh.

Ethnic groups in Cambodia
Ethnic groups in Thailand